Puran Mal was king of Gidhaur in 16th century. He was contemporary of Mughal Emperor Akbar. According to legend, he resorted Baidyanath Temple of Deoghar.

Reign
His previous generation were supported Sher Shah Suri against Mughal. In 1580 he supported rebellion against the Mughal by Masum Khan Kabuli. He also clashed with the chief of Kharagpur Raj, Sangram Singh. After suppression of rebellion, he supported Mughal expedition led by Shahbaz Khan Kamboh against the Afghans in Bengal and Odisha. 

Puran Mal was successful in establishing friendship with Shahbaz Kamboh and attacked Sangram Singh of Kharagpur. Sangram Singh had to seek shelter in forest. Puran Mal became powerful in the reign. But a when Rajput follower of Puran Mal allied with Sangram Singh, attempted to kill Shahbaz Khan Kamboh but killed another person in confusion, Shahbaz Khan Kamboh imprisonmed  Puran Mal in suspect. But later the assailant arrested and killed and Puran Mal released from Mughal imprisonment. Then Shahbaz Khan Kamboh transferred to Bengal from Bihar by Mughal. Due to this Sangram Singh again became king of Kharagpur. Later Puran Mal became independent from Mughal.

Later Raja Man Singh was able to make Sangram Singh and Puran Mal as tributary of Mughal.
In 1591, he participated in the Mughal expedition against Qutlugh Khan Lohani of Odisha with Sangram Singh of Kharagpur, Rupnarain Sisodiah, Man Singh, Yousuf Shah Chak, the ex-ruler of Kashmir and Madhu Karn Shah of Khukhra. 

According to legend, He also resorted Baidyanath Temple in Deoghar.

References 

Year of birth missing
Year of death missing
16th-century Indian monarchs